Valmikinagar Road railway station is a railway station on Muzaffarpur–Gorakhpur main line under the Samastipur railway division of East Central Railway zone. It is located beside National Highway 28B at Bagha, Rampurwa in the West Champaran district of Bihar.

References

Railway stations in West Champaran district
Samastipur railway division